Belsay Castle is a 14th-century medieval castle situated at Belsay, Northumberland, England. It is a Scheduled Monument and a Grade I listed building.

The main structure, a substantial three-storey rectangular pele tower with rounded turrets and battlements, was constructed about 1370, and was the home of the Middleton family.  In 1614 Thomas Middleton built a new manor house attached to the tower.  A west wing was added in 1711 but was largely demolished in 1872 by Sir Arthur Middleton when the remainder of the house was considerably altered.

The castle was abandoned as a residence by the family in the early 19th century when Sir Charles Monck built Belsay Hall close by.  The interiors were largely removed and it was then used as a ready-made folly, as was fashionable among the aristocracy at the time, serving as the setting for garden parties and other entertainments.

The castle is administered by English Heritage and is open to the public.

See also
Castles in Great Britain and Ireland
List of castles in England

References

External links

Belsay Hall, Castle and Gardens - official site at English Heritage
Bibliography of sources related to Belsay Castle

Grade I listed buildings in Northumberland
Houses in Northumberland
Historic house museums in Northumberland
Gardens in Northumberland
Castles in Northumberland
English Heritage sites in Northumberland
Ruins in Northumberland
Scheduled monuments in Northumberland
Castle